Goyazianthus is a genus of flowering plants in the family Asteraceae.

There is only one known species, Goyazianthus tetrastichus, endemic to Brazil (Goiás and Brazilia Distrito Federal).

References

Eupatorieae
Monotypic Asteraceae genera
Endemic flora of Brazil